Astartea granitica, commonly known as granite astartea, is a shrub endemic to Western Australia.

The shrub is found along the south coast in the South West  region of Western Australia.

References

Eudicots of Western Australia
granitica
Endemic flora of Western Australia
Plants described in 2013
Taxa named by Barbara Lynette Rye
Taxa named by Malcolm Eric Trudgen